Socket TR4, also known as Socket SP3r2, is a zero insertion force  land grid array (LGA) CPU socket designed by AMD supporting its first- and second-generation Zen-based Ryzen Threadripper desktop processors, launched on August 10, 2017 for the high-end desktop and workstation platforms. It was succeeded by Socket sTRX4 for the third generation of Ryzen Threadripper processors.

Socket TR4 is AMD's second LGA socket for a consumer product after the short lived Socket 1207 FX. It is physically identical to, but electrically incompatible with both AMD's server Socket SP3, and Socket TR4's successor socket, Socket sTRX4.

While Socket SP3 does not require a chipset, instead utilising a system-on-a-chip design, Socket TR4 and its successor require a chipset to provide improved functionality. For Socket TR4, the AMD X399 chipset was developed, which supports a total of 64 PCIe 4.0 lanes for quad SLI/CrossFire configurations.

The socket is made by both Foxconn and Lotes.

See also 
 Ryzen
 Zen (microarchitecture)
 Socket AM4
 Socket SP3
 Socket sTRX4

References 

AMD sockets